The 2022 Rhondda Cynon Taf election took place on 5 May 2022 to elect 54 members across 46 wards to Rhondda Cynon Taf County Borough Council. On the same day, elections were to the other 21 local authorities and to community councils in Wales as part of the 2022 Welsh local elections. The previous Rhondda Cynon Taf all-council election took place in 2017 and future elections will take place every five years.

Ward results 
Statements of persons nominated were published on 6 April. Results were counted on 6 May 2022. Incumbent councillors are marked with an asterisk (*).

Aberaman

Abercynon

Aberdare East

Aberdare West & Llwydcoed

Beddau & Tyn-y-Nant

Brynna and Llanharan

Church Village

Cilfynydd

Cwm Clydach

Cwmbach

Cymer

Ferndale & Maerdy

Gilfach-Goch

Glyn-Coch

Graig & Pontypridd West

Hawthorn & Lower Rhydfelen

Hirwaun, Penderyn and Rhigos

Llanharry

Llantrisant & Talbot Green

Llantwit Fardre

Llwyn-y-Pia

Mountain Ash 

Jarman had been a councillor for 46 years, but lost her seat at this election as a result of the ward boundary changes.

Penrhiw-Ceibr

Pentre

Pen-y-Graig

Pen-y-Waun

Pontyclun Central

Pontyclun East

Pontyclun West

Pontypridd Town

Porth

Rhydfelen Central

Taff’s Well

Ton-Teg

Tonypandy

Tonyrefail East

Tonyrefail West

Trallwng

Trealaw

Treforest

Treherbert

Treorchy

Tylorstown & Ynyshir

Upper Rhydfelen & Glyn-Taf

Ynysybwl

Ystrad

References

Rhondda
Rhondda Cynon Taf County Borough Council elections